The silver-headed antechinus (Antechinus argentus) is a species of dasyurid marsupial of the genus Antechinus. Described in 2013, the species is known only from so far is known to occur in just three locations: Blackdown Tableland National Park, Kroombit Tops National Park and Bulburin National Park in central Queensland. It is one of the most recently described Australian marsupials.

References

Mammals described in 2013
Marsupials of Australia
Central Queensland
Dasyuromorphs